Zhou Bozhao (born 22 November 1999) is a Chinese footballer currently playing as a midfielder for Wuhan Zall.

Club career
Zhou Bozhao would be promoted to the senior team of Wuhan Zall in the 2019 Chinese Super League campaign and would go on to make his debut on 1 May 2019 in a Chinese FA Cup game against Shanghai SIPG F.C. that ended in a 3-1 defeat.

Career statistics

References

External links

1999 births
Living people
Chinese footballers
Association football midfielders
Chinese Super League players
Wuhan F.C. players